The Koochiching County Courthouse is a Classical Revival brick building in International Falls, Minnesota, United States.
 
It was designed by Charles E. Bell and completed in 1909.

See also
 National Register of Historic Places listings in Koochiching County, Minnesota

References

External links
 Koochiching County District Court

County courthouses in Minnesota
Courthouses on the National Register of Historic Places in Minnesota
Government buildings completed in 1909
National Register of Historic Places in Koochiching County, Minnesota